Lizzie West (born in Brooklyn, NY on July 21, 1973) is a singer/songwriter.  Her music can be described as a blend of many genres including country, folk, blues, pop, and rock. Her debut album, Holy Road: Freedom Songs, was released in 2003 on Warner Bros. Records.  This album earned her the title of Breakout Artist of the Year by both AOL and Entertainment Weekly.  It was recorded with her former band, the Gangs of Kosmos.  Popular songs on the album include Dusty Turnaround, Sometime, and Holy Road.  Her second album, I Pledge Allegiance To Myself, was released in April 2006 by Appleseed Records.  A film entitled Holy Road: The Movie which describes Lizzie West, her touring, personal experiences, and musical career was in production around the time of her first album release.  However, this project was likely abandoned since her departure from Warner Bros. Records.

West spent most of her early adult life traveling across the United States while writing stories and plays.  She moved to London when she was 18.  After returning to America four years later (1995), she purchased her first guitar from a pawn shop in Nashville.  Upon returning to New York City the following year, she began performing her songs on street corners, subways, and her sister's bar, the Stinger, in Williamsburg, Brooklyn.  Her first tour of the United States came in the summer of 2000 in which she performed in bars and small clubs.  West also appeared in a commercial directed by Spike Lee for IAM.com in which she performed her song, Holy Road.  After touring again in April 2001 with the Kenny Wayne Shepherd Band and Double Trouble, she caught the attention of an A&R representative for major label Warner Bros. Records.  A multi-album recording deal with Warner Bros. Records was made in August 2001.

Some of her songs have been featured in television shows and films.  The 2002 film Secretary featured Chariots Rise on its soundtrack.  The song was re-recorded for the film, with the lyrics "What a fool am I/To fall so in love" changed to "What grace have I/To fall so in love."  The HBO feature Rock the Boat included the songs Dusty Turnaround and Sometime.  Sometime was also used in commercials advertising the show Dawson's Creek in 2003.  NBC's Third Watch and ABC's Alias featured the song Prayer, while Doctor was used in the WB drama Everwood.

West claims inspiration from the poetry and works of Walt Whitman, Jack Kerouac, William Blake, Ralph Waldo Emerson, and most notably Leonard Cohen.  (In fact she met Cohen while on tour in 2000).  She refers to her fans as "Kickers," meaning catalysts for consciousness, individual and/or collective.  West owns a dog named Figaro (aka the "dharma dog") whose pictures are featured on her album and official website.  She is known for signing her correspondence x=h/m.

Lizzie West was also involved in a podcast called The Holy Road Medicine Show with her husband, Baba.

Lizzie West was also involved with a webcast called "This Abundant Life" with her husband, Baba.

Discography

Albums 

 Holy Road - released 1999
 West (EP) - released 2002
 Holy Road: Freedom Songs - released 2003
 I Pledge Allegiance to Myself - (under the name Lizzie West & The White Buffalo) released 2006
 Chariots Rise - (under the name Lizzie West & Baba Buffalo) released 2009
 Thank You for Giving Us... (EP) - (under Lizzie & Baba) released 2011

Soundtracks

Notes

External links
Official Site
Lizzie West: Singer of the Week   AskMen.com
Wilson, Mackenzie.  Lizzie West biography on Yahoo! Music 

1973 births
Living people
Songwriters from New York (state)
21st-century American singers
21st-century American women singers